The second album by Grand Central Records artists Rae & Christian, released in 2001.
In the US it was released on the Studio !K7 label.

Track listing
 "Blazing the Crop"
 "Hold Us Down" (featuring The Congos)
 "It Ain't Nothing Like" (featuring The Pharcyde)
 "Get a Life" (featuring Bobby Womack)
 "Not Just Anybody" (featuring Kate Rogers)
 "Trailing in the Wake"
 "Vai Viver a Vida" (featuring Tania Maria)
 "Let It Go" (featuring The Pharcyde)
 "Ready to Roll"
 "Wake Up Everybody" (featuring Bobby Womack)
 "Salvation" (featuring Siron)

Personnel
Mahavishnu Orchestra – sampled strings 
Michael Ball – assistant engineer 
Mandy Parnell – mastering 
Kate Rogers – performer 
Josef – horn 
Rae & Christian – main performer 
Tania Maria – vocals 
Bobby Womack – guitar 
Dejuana Richardson – engineer 
John Schroeder – sampling
Rick Cowling – engineer
Steve Christian – engineer, mixing
Roger Wickham – horn 
Chris Owen – assistant engineer 
Eric Steinen – engineer

Charts

References

Grand Central Records albums
Rae & Christian albums
2001 albums